Dirk Jan Derksen, (born 17 June 1972) is a Dutch former professional footballer. He is one of the only players who has played for all Limburgian professional clubs (MVV, VVV, Fortuna Sittard and Roda JC).

Club career
A prolific striker, Derksen played the large part of his career in the Dutch Eerste Divisie and also had a spell with Austrian giants Austria Wien.

He retired from professional football as part of Helmond Sport in 2009. He would instead continue as an amateur player at EVV Echt while pursuing a managerial career on the side.

Managerial career
After retiring as a player, Derksen worked for VVV's commercial department and in 2011 he was named assistant to Willem II manager Jurgen Streppel. He joined former club Roda JC as a youth coach in 2013.

Personal life
He is the cousin of sports journalist and former player Johan Derksen.

References

External links
 Profile - VVV-Venlo
 Profile - Roda JC
  Profile

1972 births
Living people
People from Tiel
Dutch footballers
Association football forwards
FC Den Bosch players
Roda JC Kerkrade players
MVV Maastricht players
FC Dordrecht players
PEC Zwolle players
FK Austria Wien players
SC Cambuur players
FC Emmen players
Fortuna Sittard players
VVV-Venlo players
Helmond Sport players
RKVV EVV players
Eredivisie players
Eerste Divisie players
Austrian Football Bundesliga players
Dutch expatriate footballers
Expatriate footballers in Austria
Dutch expatriate sportspeople in Austria
SC Heerenveen non-playing staff
Roda JC Kerkrade non-playing staff
Willem II (football club) non-playing staff
Footballers from Gelderland